Tavoris Karod Cloud (born January 10, 1982) is an American professional boxer who held the IBF light heavyweight title from 2009 to 2013.

Early life
When interviewed by ESPN, Tavoris Cloud explained that he had a tough childhood. His neighbourhood, as he recalled, was very rough. He lived in a small home that housed at times 10-15 people. It was a very poor environment. He went on to explain how meager his family's situation was, and spoke on how his family used a foot tub with ice in it as a fridge. His mother Emma Smith, reflected upon the day that Tavoris Cloud declared that he was going to take care of this situation. He was around 14–15 years of age. Alonzo Johnson (Boxing Coach), trained and housed Tavoris during his high school years. Tavoris trained with Alonzo Johnson since his amateur days. Johnson worked in his corner alongside head trainer Al Bonanni during Cloud's professional fights.

Amateur career
Cloud competed at the 2002 U.S. national amateur championships, losing in the final of the light heavyweight bracket to Curtis Stevens.

Professional career
On August 8, 2008, at the Aragon Ballroom in Chicago, Cloud defeated former WBO Light Heavyweight Champion Julio César González by technical knockout in the tenth round in an IBF Light Heavyweight title eliminator. Cloud set the tempo of the fight early, hurting Gonzalez with a right cross in dominating the first round. It was more of the same in the next two rounds, although Gonzalez made the third round the most competitive. He kept the fight in the middle of the ring, but Cloud kept sending him back with uppercuts and left hooks. With González taking a beating for the majority of the fight, in round ten, the referee stopped the fight after Cloud landed a right hand.

IBF light heavyweight champion
Tavoris won the IBF Light Heavyweight title against the durable Clinton Woods by way of a 12-round unanimous decision after former champion Chad Dawson vacated the belt. The fight against Clinton Woods took place on August 28, 2009. Cloud threw well over 1000 punches in the fight which is well over the average for that weight division and won the fight by unanimous decision after 12 rounds.

Cloud defeated Glen Johnson by unanimous decision on August 7, 2010.

Cloud faced the Colombian knockout artist Fulgencio Zuniga (24-5-1 (20 KO)) for a title defense and earned a unanimous decision.

Following the Zuniga win, Cloud improved his record with another TKO decision over Yusaf Mack.

Cloud defeated Spaniard Gabriel Campillo via split decision. The win stirred up controversy, with fans scoring the bout for Campillo. However, unbeknown to Fans, "the referee said that there are no standing eight counts..."- A statement Tavoris Cloud made to Lem Satterfield when interviewed for The Ring Magazine's website The Ring. Tavoris Cloud further stated, "when we got in there the first round, and I dropped him, the referee pulled me out of the way and started to give him an eight count. I mean, that's the fight right there."

Cloud's next opponent was thought to be Former World Champion and Commonwealth Games Gold Medalist: Jean Pascal, with a scheduled fight date of August 11, 2012, but Pascal pulled out of the fight last minute due to a hand injury suffered in training. Cloud adamantly believes the injury was faked.

Consecutive defeats to Hopkins, Stevenson, Beterbiev
Cloud later took on Bernard Hopkins on March 9, 2013 at the Barclays center in Brooklyn and lost his IBF Championship via Unanimous Decision (UD).

In the following September Cloud challenged Adonis Stevenson for the WBC light-heavyweight title, and took a beating before quitting in his corner.

On September 27, 2014, Cloud faced Dagestan contender Artur Beterbiev.  Right from the start Cloud was outmatched and unable to cope with the power of his vastly larger foe, getting dropped three times in the first round before finally being for the last time early in the second.  Cloud was unable to beat referee Michael Griffin's count, making this his third consecutive loss.                              Comeback. On 11/20/2020, after a nearly 6 year hiatus,former IBF Light Heavyweight Champion Tavoris "Thunder" Cloud successfully fought out of Deadgame Fight School, defeating Ryan Soft by TKO in Daytona Beach, Florida.

Professional boxing record

References

External links

Tavoris Cloud defeats Clinton Jones – article at ESPN

1982 births
Living people
African-American boxers
International Boxing Federation champions
Sportspeople from Tallahassee, Florida
American male boxers
World light-heavyweight boxing champions
Boxers from Florida
21st-century African-American sportspeople
20th-century African-American people